The Liberia Basketball Association (LBA) is the top basketball league in Liberia. The organization organizes three divisions. The champions of the Division 1 are eligible to play in the qualifying tournaments of the Basketball Africa League (BAL).

Current clubs 
The following teams play in the Big 6 of the 2022 season:

Past champions

References

External links
Liberia: LPRC Oilers Win LBA National League for Third Year in a Row at AllAfrica.com
Liberian basketball at AfroBasket.com

Basketball competitions in Liberia
Basketball leagues in Africa